SonBinh T. Nguyen is the McCormick Professor of Teaching Excellence and the Dow Chemical Company Research Professor of Chemistry at Northwestern University. He is also the former Director of the Integrated Sciences Program.

Nguyen received his B.S. in Chemistry from the Pennsylvania State University in 1990, where he worked with Gregory L. Geoffroy. He received his Ph.D. in 1995 from the California Institute of Technology, where he was supervised by Robert Grubbs and Nathan Lewis. From 1995–1996, he worked under K. Barry Sharpless at the Scripps Research Institute as an NSF Postdoctoral Fellow. In 1997, he received a Beckman Young Investigators Award.

References

Scripps Research
Living people
21st-century American chemists
Academics of Vietnamese descent
Year of birth missing (living people)